Southern Mail or  Southern Carrier (French: Courrier sud) is a 1937 French action film directed by Pierre Billon and starring Pierre Richard-Willm, Jany Holt and Raymond Aimos. It is adapted from the 1929 novel of the same name by Antoine de Saint-Exupéry.

The film's sets were designed by the art directors André Barsacq and Léon Barsacq.

Cast 

Pierre Richard-Willm as Jacques Bernis
Jany Holt as Geneviève
Raymond Aimos as Le Sergent
Alexandre Rignault as Hubert
Roger Legris as Le Radio
 as Le Chef d'aéroport de Juby
 as Le Chef d'aéroport de Casablanca
Abel Jacquin as Le Capitaine
 as Le Joailler
Henri Crémieux as Le secrétaire
Madeleine Milhaud as La Patronne de la Pension
Odette Talazac as Aubergiste
Louis Baron fils as Le Père 
Jacques Baumer as Le Procureur
Pauline Carton as Mathilde
Gabrielle Dorziat as La Mère
Marguerite Pierry as Sophie
Charles Vanel as Herlin, Ambassadeur

References

Bibliography
 Goble, Alan. The Complete Index to Literary Sources in Film. Walter de Gruyter, 1999.

External links 

1937 films
Films based on French novels
Adaptations of works by Antoine de Saint-Exupéry
French aviation films
Pathé films
French black-and-white films
French action films
1930s action films
1930s French films